Hopewell is an unincorporated community in Baxter County, Arkansas, United States. It lies at an elevation of 778 feet (237 m).

References

Unincorporated communities in Baxter County, Arkansas
Unincorporated communities in Arkansas